Bogdan Bănuță (19 August 1965 – 19 April 1992) was a Romanian footballer who played as a midfielder. On 19 April 1992, when Inter Sibiu's team was traveling to Bistrița for a match with Gloria, their bus overturned after hitting a bridgehead in Șeica Mare and Bănuță and his teammate Radu Gabriel Năstase were the players who lost their lives in the accident.

References

1965 births
1992 deaths
Romanian footballers
Romania youth international footballers
Romania under-21 international footballers
Association football midfielders
Liga I players
Liga II players
FC Dacia Pitești players
FC Argeș Pitești players
FC Inter Sibiu players
Road incident deaths in Romania
Sportspeople from Pitești